Lil Durk 2X is the second studio album by American hip hop recording artist Lil Durk. It was released on July 22, 2016, by Only the Family and Def Jam Recordings, his final release under the latter label. Following the release of Durk's debut album, Remember My Name (2015), after suffering numerous delays. The production on the album was handled by C-Sick, DJ L, Wheezy, Sonny Digital, ChopSquad DJ, Southside, Young Chop and Zaytoven, among others.

Background
In 2016, Lil Durk announced that his next project would be his forthcoming mixtape called Lil Durk 2X, and it would be released on May 1, 2016. Durk then stated that the mixtape would have to be his second album, and this project has later been slated for a June 24, 2016 release. However, the album has been changed and slated for the July 22, 2016 release.
The OTF frontman moved approximately 7,745 physical copies of his latest project, combined with streaming sales, amounts to a total of 12,259 units.

Singles
The album's first official single, "She Just Wanna", featuring Ty Dolla Sign, was released on May 24, 2016.

Track listing

Notes
  signifies an uncredited co-producer

Charts

References

2016 albums
Albums produced by C-Sick
Albums produced by Sonny Digital
Albums produced by Southside (record producer)
Albums produced by Young Chop
Albums produced by Zaytoven
Lil Durk albums
Def Jam Recordings albums